Kokkino Nero is a village and beach located at the foot of Mount Ossa in the community of Karitsa, municipal unit of Evrymenes, municipality of Agia, Larissa, Thessaly, Greece. The name, which means "Red Water", is derived from the hot springs in the area, which are colored by mineral salts. As of the 2011 census, the village had a population of 95. Within its bounds is the site of the ancient town of Eurymenae.

External links
Κόκκινο Νερό Λάρισας

Beaches of Greece
Populated places in Larissa (regional unit)
Landforms of Larissa (regional unit)
Landforms of Thessaly
Villages in Greece